Sierra View Medical Center is a 167-bed, full-service acute care hospital located in Porterville, California. Founded in 1958, the hospital serves the Southern Sequoia region of California's Central Valley. Services include cancer care, an intensive-care unit and respiratory care.

The hospital is a part of the Sierra View Local Healthcare District. It offers a wide range of health care services featuring state of the art technologies including Magnetic Resonance Imaging (MRI) and Computed Tomography (CT). The hospital is also home to the Roger S. Good Cancer Treatment Center, which is one of eight sites selected by the University of California Los Angeles to conduct clinical trials in oncology. In July 2007, the hospital opened a 32-station outpatient Dialysis Center.

Sierra View Medical Center has earned the  Joint Commission's Gold Seal of Approval, demonstrating compliance with the highest standards of healthcare quality and safety, in addition to being awarded the Commission's Pioneers in Quality Award in 2017. It is also the only hospital in California's South Central Valley to be designated "Baby Friendly" following a World Health Organization and UNICEF-supported initiative aimed at promoting breastfeeding. In 2018, its Wound Healing Center was also nationally recognized as a Healogics Center of Excellence.

References

External links
This hospital in the CA Healthcare Atlas A project by OSHPD
 Sierra View Medical Center Honors and Accreditation

Hospital buildings completed in 1958
Hospitals in California
Porterville, California
Buildings and structures in Tulare County, California